Orestias chungarensis is a species of fish in the family Cyprinodontidae. It is endemic to Lake Chungara in Chile.

References

chungarensis
Freshwater fish of Chile
Fish described in 1987
Taxonomy articles created by Polbot
Endemic fauna of Chile